Yeni Yüzyıl University was founded in 2009 in Turkey.

References

Universities and colleges in Turkey
Educational institutions established in 2009
State universities and colleges in Turkey
2009 establishments in Turkey